Ralph Verney, 2nd Earl Verney PC, FRS (1 February 1714 – 31 March 1791), was a member of the Verney family of Middle Claydon and a British politician. 

From 1737 until 1752, when he succeeded to the earldom, he was styled Lord Fermanagh. He sat in the House of Commons several times between 1753 and 1791.

Life 

Verney was born on 1 February 1714, the son of Ralph Verney, the first Earl Verney, of Claydon House, Buckinghamshire; and Catherine, daughter to Henry Paschall of Baddow Hall in Essex.

In 1740 he married Mary, daughter of Henry Herring, a director of the Bank of England. They had no children. She died on 22 January 1791, and Verney died on 31 March of the same year; both were buried in the family vault in the church of Middle Claydon. 

He left debts of over £115,000. His various titles were extinguished at his death. His estates were inherited by Mary Verney, the daughter of his elder brother John, who had died in 1737. At the recommendation of William Pitt, she was created Baroness Fermanagh in 1792.

Politics 

Verney succeeded his father in the earldom in 1752. However, as this was an Irish peerage, it did not entitle him to a seat in the House of Lords (although it did entitle him to a seat in the Irish House of Lords). He was elected to the House of Commons for Wendover in 1753, a seat he held until 1761. He later represented Carmarthen between 1761 and 1768, and Buckinghamshire from 1768 to 1784 and again from 1790 to 1791. On 22 November 1765 he was appointed to the Privy Council.

He was elected a Fellow of the Royal Society in 1758.

Claydon House 
He rebuilt Claydon House in Buckinghamshire between 1757 and 1771. The house today represents only the west wing, which was originally connected to an identical east wing by a colonnaded rotunda surmounted by a cupola. Cost overruns on the building meant that Lord Verney had to spend the final years of his life on the continent to escape his creditors.

References 

1714 births
1791 deaths
Verney family
Earls in the Peerage of Ireland
Members of the Parliament of Great Britain for English constituencies
Members of the Parliament of Great Britain for Welsh constituencies
British MPs 1747–1754
British MPs 1754–1761
British MPs 1761–1768
British MPs 1768–1774
British MPs 1774–1780
British MPs 1780–1784
British MPs 1790–1796
Fellows of the Royal Society